Roger Alan Dudman was the Labour mayor of Oxford (England) between 1985 and 1986, succeeding the Conservative Frank Arnold Garside.

The Labour Party remained in office on the Oxford City Council until 1988, when Nellie Dorothy ("Queenie") Whorley (later Mrs Comfort) was elected. The period of office of Lord Mayor was for one year and allocated on seniority of serving on Oxford City Council.

Roger Dudman died in 1990 and several local landmarks bear his name: posthumously the Oxford road, "Roger Dudman Way", north of Oxford railway station, the site of the Castle Mill student blocks.

References

Year of birth missing
1990 deaths
Labour Party (UK) councillors
Lord Mayors of Oxford
Members of Oxford City Council